Gokul Inder Dev (1 August 1938 – 14 May 2019) was an Indian first-class cricket player. As an all-rounder, the majority of his cricket was played for and on the, Indian Armed Services cricket team.

References

1938 births
2019 deaths
Indian cricketers
Services cricketers
North Zone cricketers
Northern Punjab cricketers
Delhi cricketers
Eastern Punjab cricketers